Jerry Titus (October 24, 1928 – August 5, 1970) was an American race car driver, mechanic, and journalist.

Life 
Jerry Titus was born in Johnson City, New York on October 24, 1928. Born exactly one year before the stock market crash leading to the great depression, Titus grew up in hard times. His parents moved through many jobs, including running a dairy farm in Florida. The family eventually moved back to New York, his mother taking a job at Grumman Aircraft and his father operating a Sinclair gas station, and installing heating and cooling units.

Titus originally became a trumpeter, at which he had a great talent for. This led him to studying at the renown Juilliard School of Music in New York City and performing in the band of jazz trombonist Jack Teagarden.

Titus eventually changed careers and became an auto mechanic, working for car customizer Bill Frick, at his performance auto shop. Titus discovered his talent for driving sports cars from testing vehicles and repairing customers' race cars while employed by Frick.

In the later 1950s Titus put this skill to use, racing in the amateur Formula Junior series.

He discovered another passion working for Frick; automotive journalism. Titus wrote his first article for Speed Age in 1954, and was later ghostwriting for Sports Car Illustrated. This led him to be a part of the editorial staff of Sports Car Graphic.

Titus' reporting and hands on reviews of sports cars transitioned into demand for Titus as a test driver for various racing programs, including the Bill Thomas Cheetah, and Elva Porsche.

Sports Car Graphic supported Titus' racing habits by sponsoring him in a factory racing Sunbeam Alpine in 1962 and 1963.

Titus' son Rick Titus is an automotive journalist and former race car driver himself.

Racing career 
Jerry Titus once again captured the attention of Carroll Shelby, as Titus had once repaired a Maserati race car for Shelby during a test drive of the 1965 Shelby GT350 for Sports Car Graphic.  Shelby offered Titus a place on his SCCA National Championship team, and Titus won the 1965 Pacific Coast National Championship with a production GT350.

In 1966 Titus entered the newly created SCCA Trans-Am series for Shelby's Terlingua Racing Team and achieved victory at the last race of the season at Riverside International Raceway.

Titus left his position as editor-in-chef at Sports Car Graphic and became a full-time racing driver for Shelby's team. He went on to become the number one team driver and won both the 1967 Manufacturer's Championship for Ford and the 1967 Driver's Championship as well.

In the 1968 season, poor performance by the Terlingua team, which resulted in four DNFs out of 12 starts, had Titus preparing to leave the team to race a Pontiac Firebird.  When Carroll Shelby learned of the impending change, he decided not to enter Titus in the last race of the season.  Not to be deterred, with funding by Canadian businessman Terry Godsall, he purchased a used 1968 Camaro Z/28 Trans Am car and reskinned it as a Firebird, with plans to race it under T-G Racing banner for the 1969 series.

Titus entered the 1969 24 Hours of Daytona and raced to a class victory and an overall third place.

The 1969 season was plagued with engine configuration problems for the new car, resulting in 3 DNFs for the team. The highlight of the season was a second-place finish for Titus at Sainte Jovite, Quebec.

Titus completed only one race out of seven in the 1970 season, taking seventh place at Laguna Seca.

Death 
While driving in a practice session on July 19, 1970 for the Trans Am race at Road America during the 1970 season, Jerry Titus' Pontiac Firebird experienced a steering gear failure that caused him to crash into the Bill Mitchell Bridge abutment on the outside of Turn 13. Titus was badly injured and taken to Milwaukee Hospital where he succumbed to his injuries on August 5, 1970.

Titus became known by the nickname "Mr. Trans Am".

The Billy Mitchell Bridge, which transporters used to access the circuit, became a source of controversy for many years at Road America with both cars and motorcycles for safety reasons. After Memo Gidley's serious crash at the 2001 CART race at the circuit, and complaints by motorcycle racers, officials began formulating a plan to fix the problem. In the winter of 2006, the bridge was demolished, adding runoff at Turn 13 while adding a new tunnel and eliminating the point of impact where Titus was badly injured.

Shortly after his death, the American Auto Racing Writers and Broadcasters Association has named their annual "Driver of the Year" award, which is currently given to the driver with the most votes among the winners in each category (stock car, open wheel, road racing, short track, touring, and at-large), the Jerry Titus Memorial Award.

Racing results

SCCA National Championship Runoffs

Awards 

He was inducted into the Motorsports Hall of Fame of America in 2010.

References 

1928 births
1970 deaths
Trans-Am Series drivers
24 Hours of Daytona drivers
SCCA National Championship Runoffs winners